Raymond Sargent (2 October 1952 – 9 March 2008) was a British actor, musician and dramatist.

Early life
Along with his sister Jean, he was born in the town of Poole, Dorset to a mother from Lancashire and Poole father.

Career
Following several years of study as an electro-mechanic instrument mechanic, then an instrument maker Raymond discovered a passion for drama when his future wife Julia Banwell introduced him to amateur dramatics. He then studied acting professionally at Mountview Theatre School in London.

Theatre
He toured for two years from 1994–1996 with the highly successful nationally touring musical production of The Buddy Holly Story playing Norman Petty and Jack Daw, he also played parts in The Resistible Rise of Arturo Ui, Rhinoceros! and Hard Times.

Television
During his early career, he played small parts in television programmes such as Only Fools and Horses, Miss Marple, cult programmes The Two Ronnies, Blake's 7 and Doctor Who. He later played larger parts in 'Let's Roll- The Story of Flight 93' and 'Time Tourists'. He also appeared in several television advertisements and training videos.

Film
Raymond performed in many student films throughout his career including several for local filmmaker Jamie Shearing.

Music
Raymond was a self-taught musician playing the saxophone, guitar, recorder, accordion, bagpipes, piano and flute amongst other instruments. He played in medieval trio the Wimborne Minstrels, with Charles Spicer and Phil Humphries and in a ceilidh band called No Strings Attached. Raymond wrote original music for his one-man shows and for other projects such as the 'New Music for the River Stour' project, which was performed in Wimborne, Dorset by a local choir.

Dramatisations
Raymond was best known for touring his one-man shows nationally. From 2002 onwards, he performed theatrical adaptations of The Three Strangers by Thomas Hardy and The Signalman by Charles Dickens as halves of his production 'Two Victorian Tales'. He also performed an original dramatisation of T. E. Lawrence's last years and his relationship with Thomas Hardy.

Dance
Raymond was an experienced folk dance 'caller' and applied the skills used for his one-man shows to ceilidh dancing to dance, providing lower cost folk dances by accompanying self-created backing tracks on his saxophone, demonstrating and instructing or 'calling' dances by himself. These were known as 'Track Ceilidhs'.
Raymond provided the choreography for LWT's television adaptation of The Mayor of Casterbridge, which he was also an extra in along with his wife Julia, and daughter Laura.

Writing
Raymond held educational workshops on adapting written material for the stage, original script writing, theatre skills, public address and poetry writing. He also read poetry for BBC Radio 4's Poetry Please.

References

T. E. Lawrence#cite note-21

External links
http://www.raymondsargent.com/biog.htm
http://www.raymondsargent.com/two_victorian_tales.htm
http://www.raymondsargent.com/wimborne_minstrels.htm
http://www.imdb.com/name/nm2436988/
http://www.imdb.com/title/tt1223881/

1952 births
2008 deaths
English male film actors
People from Poole
English male dramatists and playwrights
20th-century English dramatists and playwrights
20th-century English male writers